Garlic Creek is located in north Hays County near Buda, Texas.  Its headwaters are near the intersection of Ranch to Market Road 967 and Farm to Market Road 1626.  It is a tributary to Onion Creek, which is a tributary of the Colorado River which empties into the Gulf of Mexico.  Garlic Creek was originally named Labinski Branch for one of the first settlers in Hays County, Texas.  Victor Labenski built a log cabin on the banks of what is now called Garlic Creek in 1855.

See also
List of rivers of Texas

External links
 

Rivers of Hays County, Texas
Rivers of Travis County, Texas
Rivers of Texas